"Tonight's Today" is the first single by singer-songwriter Jack Peñate from his second album Everything Is New.

The music video makes reference to the choreography featured in Windowlicker by Aphex Twin.

Peñate told the NME that "Tonight's Today", "is very much about maybe having too much fun. Fun can be addictive, when things don't really seem to matter or be understood."

"Tonight's Today" peaked at #23 on the UK Singles Chart, becoming Peñate's third top forty single in the UK.

Charts

References

2009 singles
XL Recordings singles
2009 songs